The 2019–20 Nemzeti Bajnokság I (known as the K&H női kézilabda liga for sponsorship reasons) was the 69th season of the Nemzeti Bajnokság I, Hungarian premier Handball league. On 9 April 2020 the Hungarian Handball Federation decided to cancel the season with immediate effect due to the COVID-19 pandemic. In the meaning of the decision there will be no national champion named, the results of the season will be deleted and the final league table of the 2018/19 season will determine which clubs will participate in the international competitions in 2020/21.

Team information 
As in the previous season, 14 teams played in the 2019–20 season.
After the 2018–19 season, Budaörs Handball and Eszterházy KESC were relegated to the 2019–20 Nemzeti Bajnokság I/B. They were replaced by two clubs from the 2018–19 Nemzeti Bajnokság I/B; Szent István SE and Szombathelyi KKA.

Personnel and kits
Following is the list of clubs competing in 2019–20 Nemzeti Bajnokság I, with their president, head coach, kit manufacturer and shirt sponsor.

Managerial changes

League table

Schedule and results
In the table below the home teams are listed on the left and the away teams along the top.

Season statistics

Top goalscorers

Attendances

1: Team played last season in Nemzeti Bajnokság I/B.
Updated on 21 April 2020.
Source: League matches: NB I 2019/2020
Attendance numbers without playoff matches.

Number of teams by counties

See also
 2019–20 Magyar Kupa
 2019–20 Nemzeti Bajnokság I/B
 2019–20 Nemzeti Bajnokság II

References

External links
 Hungarian Handball Federaration 
 handball.hu

Nemzeti Bajnokság I (women's handball)
2019–20 domestic handball leagues
Nemzeti Bajnoksag I Women
2019 in women's handball
2020 in women's handball
Nemzeti Bajnokság I (women's handball)